James Everett Sanders (March 8, 1882 – May 12, 1950) was an American political figure. He was Presidential secretary to President Calvin Coolidge and chairman of the Republican National Committee. He served four terms in the  U.S House of Representatives from 1917 to 1925, representing Indiana.

Biography
Born in Coalmont, Indiana, Sanders attended the Indiana State Normal School, now Indiana State University, and then graduated from Indiana University. He practiced law in Terre Haute, Indiana.

Political career 
From 1917 until 1925 Sanders represented Indiana in the United States Congress. He declined to be re-nominated in 1924, and instead became director of the Speakers' Bureau of the Republican National Committee. Subsequently, in 1925, he accepted the job and replaced C. Bascom Slemp as the personal secretary to President Coolidge early in his second term. During his time as presidential secretary (a position equivalent to the current White House Chief of Staff) Sanders amassed a collection of presidential speeches that became known as the 'Everett Sanders Papers', which contain speeches from June 22, 1925 until February 22, 1929. Sanders also became a member of the Alfalfa Club after 1926.

Sanders was so highly regarded that, after leaving the position in 1929 after Coolidge's second term, President Herbert Hoover appointed him to chair the Republican National Committee, a position he held from 1932 until he stepped down in 1934 after Hoover's disastrous re-election campaign.

Death 
Sanders died in Washington, D.C., in 1950, and is buried in Indiana, in the Highland Lawn Cemetery in Terre Haute.

References
 The Everett Sanders Papers retrieved on March 25, 2007.

External links

|-

|-

1882 births
1950 deaths
20th-century American politicians
Indiana State University alumni
Indiana University Maurer School of Law alumni
Personal secretaries to the President of the United States
Politicians from Terre Haute, Indiana
People from Clay County, Indiana
Coolidge administration personnel
Indiana lawyers
Lawyers from Washington, D.C.
Republican Party members of the United States House of Representatives from Indiana